The Junior League World Series Host team is one of six United States regions that sends teams to the World Series in Taylor, Michigan. The host team first competed in the JLWS in 1985. It was discontinued after 1989, but returned in 2018.

Host teams at the Junior League World Series

Results by Host

See also
Host Teams in other Little League divisions:
Intermediate League
Senior League
Big League

References

Junior League World Series
Host